was a Japanese animation studio based in Suginami, Tokyo and active from 1996 to 2020.

History
The studio was formed on November 18, 1996 from a merger between Dandelion (founded in 1992) and Triple X (founded in 1993). After the merger, the studio continued to credit some of its work under the old names  and  until 2002, and did some minor work under the name Garyū Studio in the early 2000s.

The animator and character designer Rin Shin is the chief animation director for several productions by Arms which tend to have an above-average amount of fan service, for example the Ikki Tousen and Queen's Blade series. She also developed the character designs for I"s Pure.

After its founding, ARMS was, at first, a producer of hentai (most notably its productions with Green Bunny), but ceased productions of erotica in the mid-2000s with the growing popularity of their televised works.

Common Sense era
The company officially changed its name from Arms to Common Sense (株式会社コモンセンス) in August 31, 2017, but maintained the Arms label as a trade name.

On May 31, 2020, Common Sense decided dissolving the company following a shareholder meeting, with Tokyo district court accepting notice of liquidation filed in July 22, 2020.

Productions

Hentai

Television series

OVAs

Films

References

External links
  (in Japanese)
 

 
Companies that have filed for bankruptcy in Japan
Defunct mass media companies of Japan
Japanese companies established in 1996
Japanese companies disestablished in 2020
Mass media companies established in 1996
Mass media companies disestablished in 2020
Japanese animation studios
Animation studios in Tokyo
Hentai companies